Chicago Technical College (CTC) was a private junior college founded in 1904 in Chicago. CTC closed in 1977.

Courses
As of 1925, CTC offered both day and night classes with Diplomas in Architecture, Civil, Mechanical and Electrical Engineering in two years and Bachelors after three years of day classes.

Campuses
Locations included the original CTC home, the "Lake View" building at 116 S. Michigan Avenue.  At some point before 1918 day classes were held in new Chicago “Tech” Building at 2721 S. Michigan Avenue. 

By 1928, the school was in a new two-story building at the corner of 26th and Indiana Streets. Some time before 1950 CTC moved to a three-story building at 2000 South Michigan Avenue.

References

Defunct universities and colleges in Illinois
Technological universities in the United States
History of Chicago
1904 establishments in Illinois
1977 disestablishments in Illinois
Educational institutions established in 1904
Educational institutions disestablished in 1977